Shiddat: Journey Beyond Love, or simply Shiddat, is a 2021 Indian Hindi-language romantic drama film directed by Kunal Deshmukh and produced by Bhushan Kumar, Krishan Kumar and Dinesh Vijan under their banners T-Series and Maddock Films. The film stars Sunny Kaushal, Radhika Madan, Mohit Raina and Diana Penty. 

The film premiered on 1 October 2021 on Disney+ Hotstar.

Plot

The film starts with the marriage of Gautam and Ira [fellow mates at French university]. Jaggi, a rank guest at the wedding, creates a scene and gets caught with his friends for gatecrashing the party. 3 years later, Jaggi  crosses the border illegally, intending to reach London, but get caught and taken back to the embassy [where Gautam works]. Jaggi explains to him that he has to reach London before Monday to his love, being inspired by Gautam's speech on reception day. The film flashes back to three months ago.

Jaggi, a hockey player, meets Kartika, a swimmer, and though the two get off to a rocky start, they start spending time together and grow close.  Jaggi finds out she is getting married she tells him that if his feelings are true, he should come to London after three months, in which case she will cancel the wedding. Jaggi enters the UK illegally and faces many hurdles trying to reach Kartika before her wedding and after falling off a plane Jaggi dies leaving Kartika heartbroken. The film end with Kartika along with Gautam, Ira and all their friends trying to celebrate Jaggi's life, remembering him.

Cast
 Sunny Kaushal as Joginder "Jaggi"
 Radhika Madan as Kartika Bhosle
 Mohit Raina as Gautam Sehgal
 Diana Penty as Ira Sharma Sehgal
 Arjun Singh as Ketan
 Vidhatri Bandi as Sheena
 Gaurav Amlani as Pinkesh
 Gandharv Dewan as Rana "Rane" Chaudhry
 Chirag Malhotra as Bilal
 Hoomayun as Nazir
 Babraqk Akbari as Tarekh
 Atul Kumar as Rajesh Bhosle 
 Nazneen Madan as Manjari Singhania
 Rajendra Shisatkat as Coach Damle
 Diljohn as  Kersie Marfatia
 Floriane Andersen as Natalie

Production

Development
The film was announced on 16 May 2019 by Dinesh Vijan.

Casting
Radhika Madan, Sunny Kaushal, Mohit Raina and Diana Penty were signed for the lead roles.

Filming
Principal photography commenced in November 2019.

Soundtrack 

The film's music was composed by Sachin–Jigar, Manan Bhardwaj and Gourov Dasgupta while lyrics written by Kausar Munir, Priya Saraiya, Kunwar Juneja and Manan Bhardwaj.

The song Akhiyan Udeek Diyan  is a remake of Nusrat Fateh Ali Khan's 1993 qawwali song.

References

External links
 
 

Disney+ Hotstar original films
2021 films
Indian romantic drama films
Films set in Mumbai